The Ministry of Industries and Production is headed by the Minister for Industries and Production and Pakistan Secretary of Industries and Production.

Pakistan Industrial Development Corporation

Pakistan Industrial Development Corporation (PIDC) is a state corporation of Pakistan under Ministry of Industries and Production. It was created to set up industries in Pakistan in such fields where the private sector was shy and where large amount of capital outlay with long gestation period was required.

Subsidiary Companies
 National Industrial Parks Development and Management Company
 Technology Up-Gradation and Skill Development Company
 Karachi Tools, Dies And Moulds Centre
 Pakistan Stone Development Company
 Pakistan Gems & Jewellery Development Company
 Pakistan Hunting & Sporting Arms Development Company
 Furniture Pakistan Company
 Southern Punjab Embroidery Industry
 Aik Hunar Aik Nagar
 Pakistan Chemical And Energy Sector Skills Development

Small and Medium Enterprises Development Authority

Small and Medium Enterprises Development Authority is an autonomous institution of the Government of Pakistan under Ministry of Industries and Production. SMEDA was established in October 1998 for encouraging and facilitating the development and growth of small and medium enterprises in the country.

Utility Stores Corporation

Utility Stores Corporation of Pakistan is an organization that operates chain stores throughout Pakistan that provide basic commodities to general public at subsidized rates.

See also 
 Economy of Pakistan
 Ministry of Commerce (Pakistan)

External links
 Ministry of Industry

References

Industries and Production